The Iowa Community College Athletic Conference (ICCAC) is the Region 11 of the National Junior College Athletic Association (NJCAA). The Commissioner's Office, headquartered in Ames, Iowa oversees 25 sports. Conference championships are held in most sports and individuals can be named to All-Conference and All-Academic teams.

Member schools

Current members
The ICCAC currently has 14 full members, all are public schools:

Notes

Partial members
The ICCAC has one partial member, which is also a public school:

Notes

Former members
The ICCAC had five former full members, three were public schools:

Notes

Sports sponsored
The ICCAC member teams compete in:

 Baseball (men's)
 Basketball (men's & women's)
 Bowling (men's & women's)
 Cross country (men's & women's)
 Football (men's)
 Golf (men's & women's)
 Indoor track & field (men's & women's)
 Outdoor track & field (men's & women's)
 Rodeo (men's & women's)
 Soccer (men's & women's)
 Softball (women's)
 Sports shooting (men's & women's)
 Swimming & diving (men's & women's)
 Volleyball (women's)
 Wrestling (men's)

National championships

Football
 1976 Ellsworth (9-0)
 1978 Iowa Central (9-1)
 1987 Ellsworth (10-0)
 2012 Iowa Western (12-0)

Men's Basketball
 1971 Ellsworth
 1995 NIACC (DII)
 1997 Indian Hills
 1998 Indian Hills
 1998 Kirkwood (DII)
 1999 Indian Hills
 2000 Southeastern
 2003 Southeastern
 2004 Southeastern
 2016 Kirkwood (DII)
 2017 Southwestern (DII)
 2021 Des Moines Area (DII)

Women's Basketball
 1997 Kirkwood (DII)
 2002 Kirkwood (DII)
 2007 Kirkwood (DII)
 2008 Kirkwood (DII)
 2009 Kirkwood (DII)
 2010 Kirkwood (DII)
 2017 Kirkwood (DII)

Baseball
 2010 Iowa Western
 2012 Iowa Western
 2014 Iowa Western

Men's Bowling
 2017 Iowa Central

Men's Cross Country
 2014 Iowa Central
 2015 Iowa Central

Women's Cross Country
 2007 Iowa Central
 2008 Iowa Central
 2011 Iowa Central
 2012 Iowa Central
 2013 Iowa Central

Men's Half Marathon
 2007 Iowa Central
 2011 Iowa Central
 2012 Iowa Central
 2013 Iowa Central
 2016 Iowa Central

Women's Half Marathon
 2011 Iowa Central
 2012 Iowa Central
 2016 Iowa Central

Men's Golf
 2000 Indian Hills
 2011 Indian Hills
 2012 Indian Hills
 2014 Indian Hills
 2015 Indian Hills

Men's Soccer
 2013 Iowa Western

Women's Soccer
 2013 Iowa Western
 2015 Iowa Central

Softball
 1977 Ellsworth
 2003 Southeastern

Men's Track and Field
 2011 Iowa Central (Indoor)
 2012 Iowa Central (Indoor)
 2014 Iowa Central (Indoor)
 2016 Iowa Central (Indoor)
 2017 Iowa Central (Indoor)

Women's Track and Field
 2010 Iowa Central (Indoor)
 2012 Iowa Central (Indoor)
 2013 Iowa Central (Outdoor)
 2014 Iowa Central (Indoor)
 2016 Iowa Central (Indoor)
 2016 Iowa Central (Outdoor)

Volleyball
 2003 Kirkwood
 2006 Iowa Western

Wrestling
 1973 NIACC
 1981 Iowa Central
 2002 Iowa Central
 2006 Iowa Central
 2007 Iowa Central
 2008 Iowa Central
 2009 Iowa Central
 2015 Iowa Central
 2017 Iowa Central

The Graphic Edge Bowl
The ICCAC, along with primary sponsor The Graphic Edge, puts on two annual bowl games the first Sunday of December at the UNI-Dome in Cedar Falls. The two games feature the top two teams from the ICCAC versus at-large qualifiers. If one of the Iowa teams has qualified for the NJCAA national championship game, the "feature" game becomes the national championship game if the best Iowa team is ranked No. 1. If the best Iowa team is ranked No. 2, the third-best Iowa team takes its place in the Graphic Edge Bowl. It's possible for both Iowa teams to have losing records in this case as the NJCAA does not require a team to have a winning record to qualify for a bowl game.

The now-defunct Midwest Football Conference, which featured as many as 10 teams from Iowa, Illinois, Michigan and North Dakota sent the champions of each of its divisions unless one of them qualified for the national championship game as the No. 2-ranked team, in which case another Midwest Football Conference team qualified for the bowl in its place.

The second-best Iowa team plays one of the at-large teams in the first game, which kicks off at 11 a.m. The best Iowa team plays another at-large team in the 2:30 p.m. "Feature" game, which can be for the NJCAA title if the Iowa team is ranked No. 1 and the No. 2 team is able to accept a bid to the game. 

The two at-large bids vary from year-to-year, but recent tendency is that the 11 a.m. game features one of the better teams from the MCAC (Minnesota College Athletic Conference) and that the later game features a highly-ranked opponent.

See also
National Junior College Athletic Association (NJCAA)

External links

NJCAA Website

NJCAA conferences
College sports in Iowa